Ewa Kasprzyk may refer to:

Ewa Kasprzyk (actress) (born 1957), Polish actress
Ewa Kasprzyk (athlete) (born 1957), retired Polish athlete